Illés Zöldesi (born 9 February 1998) is a Hungarian football goalkeeper.

Career statistics
.

References

External links
 
 

1998 births
People from Nyíregyháza
Living people
Hungarian footballers
Hungary under-21 international footballers
Association football goalkeepers
Diósgyőri VTK players
Fehérvár FC players
Kisvárda FC players
Zalaegerszegi TE players
Debreceni VSC players
Nemzeti Bajnokság I players
Nemzeti Bajnokság II players
Sportspeople from Szabolcs-Szatmár-Bereg County